Tarur is a gram panchayat in the Palakkad district, state of Kerala, India. It is the local government organisation that serves the villages of Tarur-I and Tarur-II.

References 

Gram panchayats in Palakkad district